Baron Emmanuel 'Toulo' de Graffenried (18 May 1914, Paris, France – 22 January 2007, Lonay, Switzerland) was a Swiss motor racing driver. He participated in 23 World Championship Grands Prix, debuting on 13 May 1950, and scored a total of nine championship points. He also participated in numerous non-Championship Formula One races.

De Graffenried was born in Paris, the son of Swiss Baron Leo de Graffenried and his American wife Irma Stern. He began his racing career in 1936, driving his own Maserati voiturette. Some of his most memorable results came at his home track: the challenging, cobbled, street circuit at Bremgarten near Bern. He won the 1949 British Grand Prix, a year before the FIA World Championship began. In that inaugural year de Graffenried contested four of the season's seven races, with mixed results. He continued to drive in occasional races over the next six years, with his best finish being fourth place at the 1953 Belgian Grand Prix.

Following his retirement from racing, de Graffenried managed his car dealership in Lausanne, featuring Alfa Romeo, Rolls-Royce and Ferrari automobiles. He also acted as stunt double for Kirk Douglas during the filming of The Racers. Later, he became a common figure at Formula One events during the 1970s and 1980s as the corporate ambassador for Phillip Morris' Marlboro cigarette brand.

In recognition of his win at the first British Grand Prix, de Graffenried made his last appearance at the wheel of a racing car during the 1998 celebrations of Silverstone's 50th anniversary at age 84.

He was the last surviving driver to have competed in the first World Championship Formula One Grand Prix.

Racing record

Complete European Championship results
(key) (Races in bold indicate pole position; races in italics indicate fastest lap)

Post WWII Grandes Épreuves results
(key) (Races in bold indicate pole position; races in italics indicate fastest lap)

Complete Formula One World Championship results
(key) (Races in bold indicate pole position; races in italics indicate fastest lap)

References

External links
Obituary: 'Toulo' de Graffenried. (2007) Motor Sport, LXXXIII/4, p. 15

 

1914 births
2007 deaths
Swiss racing drivers
Swiss Formula One drivers
Swiss motorsport people
Enrico Platé Formula One drivers
Alfa Romeo Formula One drivers
Scuderia Centro Sud Formula One drivers
Grand Prix drivers
Formula One team owners
Formula One team principals
Toulo
European Championship drivers